Dolenje Podpoljane is a small settlement halfway between Ribnica and Velike Lašče in southern Slovenia. The area is part of the traditional region of Lower Carniola and is now included in the Southeast Slovenia Statistical Region.

References

External links
Dolenje Podpoljane on Geopedia

Populated places in the Municipality of Ribnica